The Reading Classic was an annual bicycle road racing event held in Reading, Pennsylvania from 2006 to 2008.  In its inaugural year, the 2006 Reading Classic was part of the Commerce Bank Triple Crown of Cycling on the United States' Pro Cycling Tour (PCT), and served as a remplacement of the Trenton Classic. The men's elite event is ranked 1.1 by the International Cycling Union (UCI), the sport's governing body, and is part of the UCI America Tour.

Men's results 

2006 results
1.  Greg Henderson, Health Net Pro Cycling Team Presented by Maxxis
2.  Sergey Lagutin, Navigators Insurance Cycling Team
3.  Danny Pate, Team TIAA–CREF
2007 results
1.  Bernhard Eisel, T-Mobile Team
2.  Alejandro Barrajo, Rite Aid Pro Cycling
3.  Oleg Grishkin, Navigators Insurance Cycling Team
2008 results
1.  Óscar Sevilla, Rock Racing
2.  Edvald Boasson Hagen, Team High Road
3.  Bernhard Eisel, Team High Road

Women's results 
2006 results
1.  Ina Teutenberg, T-Mobile Women
2.  Katherine Carroll, Victory Brewing Pro Cycling Team
3.  Rochelle Gilmore, Advil-Chapstick USA
2007 results
1.  Ina Teutenberg, T-Mobile Women
2.  Theresa Cliff Ryan, Verducci Breakaway Racing
3.  Laura Van Gilder, Cheerwine
2008 results
1.  Ina Teutenberg, Team High Road
2.  Joanne Kiesanowski, Team TIBCO
3.  Laura Van Gilder, Cheerwine

See also 
 Lancaster Classic
 Philadelphia International Championship
 Liberty Classic
 List of road bicycle racing events

External links 
 Pro Cycling Tour (PCT)

Cycle races in the United States
Sports in Reading, Pennsylvania
Women's road bicycle races
Recurring sporting events established in 2006
2006 establishments in Pennsylvania
UCI America Tour races
2008 disestablishments in Pennsylvania
Recurring sporting events disestablished in 2008